Washington State government consists of more than 190 agencies, departments, and commissions.

The main administrative departments are:

 Agriculture (WSDA)
 Archaeology and Historic Preservation (DAHP)
 Commerce (COM)
 Corrections (DOC)
 Children, Youth, and Families (DCYF)
 Ecology (ECY)
 Employment Security Department (ESD)
 Washington State Technology Solutions (WaTech)
 Financial Institutions (DFI)
 Fish and Wildlife (WDFW)
 Health (DOH)
 Labor and Industries (L&I)
 Licensing (DOL)
 Washington Military Department (MIL)
 Natural Resources (DNR)
 Puget Sound Partnership
 Retirement Systems (DRS)
  Revenue (DOR)
 Services for the Blind (DSB)
 Social and Health Services (DSHS)
 Transportation (WSDOT)
 Veterans Affairs (DVA)

Others include:

 Accountancy, State Board of (WBOA)
 Administrative Hearings, Office of (OAH)
 Actuary, Office of the State (OSA)
 African-American Affairs, Washington State Commission on (CAA)
 Aging & Long Term Care of Eastern Washington (ALTCEW)
 Air National Guard (WAANG)
 Washington Apple Commission (APPLE)
 Architects, Board of Registration for (BRA)
 Army National Guard (WAARNG)
 Arts Commission, Washington State (ARTS)
 Asian Pacific American Affairs, State of Washington Commission on (CAPAA)
 Asparagus Commission (ASPAR)
 Attorney General, Office of the (ATG)
 Audit and Review Committee, Joint Legislative (JLARC)
 Auditor, Washington State (SAO)
 Aviation, Department of Transportation (DOTA)
 Beef Commission (BEEF)
 Biodiversity Council (BDC)
 Blind, Washington State School for the (WSSB)
 Blueberry Commission (BLUE)
 Building Code Council, State (SBCC)
 Caseload Forecast Council, State of Washington (CFC)
 Center for Childhood Deafness and Hearing Loss, Washington State (WSD)
 Citizens Commission on Salaries for Elected Officials, Washington (SALARIES)
 Civil Legal Aid, Office of (OCLA)
 Code Reviser Statute Law Committee (SLC)
 Columbia River Gorge Commission (CRG)
 Combined Fund Drive (CFD)
 Community & Technical Colleges, State Board for (SBCTC)
 Conservation Commission, State (SCC)
 County Road Administration Board (CRAB)
 Court of Appeals (COA)
 Courts, Administrative Office of the (AOC)
 Criminal Justice Training Commission, Washington State (CJTC)
 Dairy Products Commission (DAIRY)
 Deaf and Hard of Hearing, Office of the (ODHH)
 Developmental Disabilities Council (DDC)
 Disability Issues and Employment, Governor's Committee on (GCDE)
 Early Learning, Department of (DEL)
 Economic and Revenue Forecast Council (ERFC)
 Economic Development Commission (WEDC)
 Economic Development Finance Authority (WEDFA)
 Education Research and Data Center (ERDC)
 Washington State Board of Education (SBE)
 Emergency Management Division (EMD)
 Energy Facility Site Evaluation Council (EFSEC)
 Engineers and Land Surveyors, Board of Registration for (BRELS)
 Environmental Hearings Office (EHO)
 Executive Ethics Board (ETHICS)
 Expenditure Limit Committee (ELC)
 Extension Energy Program (ENERGY)
 Family Policy Council (FPC)
 Financial Management, Office of (OFM)
 Fish and Wildlife, Department of (DFW)
 Forest Practices Appeals Board (FPAB)
 Forest Practices Board (FPB)
 Freight Mobility Strategic Investment Board (FMSIB)
 Fruit Commission (FRUIT)
 Gambling Commission, Washington State (WSGC)
 General Administration, Department of (GA)
 Geographic Information Council, Washington State (WAGIC)
 Geographic Names, Washington State Board on (WBGN)
 Governor, Office of the (GOVERNOR)
 Governor's Office of Indian Affairs (GOIA)
 Grain Commission (WGC)
 Growth Management Hearings Boards (GMBH)
 Hardwoods Commission (WHC)
 Health Care Authority, Washington State (HCA)
 Health Care Facilities Authority (WHCFA)
 Health, Washington State Board of (SBOH)
 Higher Education Coordinating Board (HECB)
 Higher Education Facilities Authority (WHEFA)
 Hispanic Affairs, Washington State Commission on (CHA)
 Historical Society, Eastern Washington State (WSHSEAST)
 History Museum, State (WSHS)
 Home Care Referral Registry (HCRR)
 Horse Racing Commission, Washington State (WHRC)
 House of Representatives, Washington State (HOUSE)
 Housing Finance Commission (WSHFC)
 Human Rights Commission (HRC)
 Hydraulics Appeals Board (HAB)
 Indeterminate Sentence Review Board (SRB)
 Industrial Insurance Appeals, Board of (BIIA)
 Information Services, Department of (DIS)
 Insurance Commissioner, Office of the (OIC)
 Investment Board, Washington State (SIB)
 Jail Industries Board (JIB)
 Joint Transportation Committee (JTC)
 Judicial Conduct, Commission on (CJC)
 K-20 Education Network (K20)
 Labor Relations Office (LABOR)
 Land Commissioner, Office of the (CPL)
 Land Use Study Commission (LANDUSE)
 Landscape Architects, Board of Registration for (BRLA)
 Law Enforcement Officers and Fire Fighters' Plan 2 Retirement Board (LEOFF)
 Law Library, State (SLL)
 Legislative Ethics Board (LEB)
 Legislative Evaluation and Accountability Program Committee (LEAP)
 Legislature Customer Service Center (LEGCS)
 Legislature, State (LEG)
 Library, State (LIB)
 Licensing, Department of (DOL)
 Lieutenant Governor, Office of (LTGOV)
 Liquor Control Board (LIQ)
 Lottery, Washington State (LOTTERY)
 Marine Employees Commission (MAR)
 Medical Quality Assurance Commission (MQAC)
 Minority and Justice Commission, State (MJC)
 Minority and Women's Business Enterprises, Office of (OMWBE)
 Monitoring Salmon Recovery and Watershed Health, Forum on (MSRWH)
 National and Community Service, Commission for (WCNCS)
 Northwest Cherries (CHERRY)
 Northwest Indian Fisheries Commission (NWIFC)
 Northwest Power and Conservation Council (NPCC)
 Ombudsman, Office of the Education (OEO)
 Ombudsman, Office of the Family and Children's (OFCO)
 Ombudsman, Open Government (OGO)
 Parks and Recreation Commission, State (PARKS)
 Pension Policy, Select Committee on (SCPP)
 Personnel Resources Board (PRB)
 Personnel, Department of (DOP)
 Pesticide Registration, State Commission on (WSCPR)
 Pharmacy, Board of (BOP)
 Pilotage Commissioners, Board of (PILOTAGE)
 Pollution Control Hearings Board (PCHB)
 Pollution Liability Insurance Agency, Washington State (PLIA)
 Potato Commission (POTATO)
 Printing, Department of (PRT)
 Productivity Board (PB)
 Professional Educator Standards Board (PESB)
 Psychology, Board of (PSYCH)
 Public Defense, Office of (OPD)
 Public Deposit Protection Commission (PDPC)
 Public Disclosure Commission (PDC)
 Public Employees Benefits Board Program (PEBB)
 Public Employment Relations Commission (PERC)
 Public Instruction, Office of Superintendent of (OSPI)
 Public Works Board (PWB)
 Puget Sound Partnership (PSP)
 Real Estate Appraiser Commission (REAC)
 Real Estate Commission (REC)
 Recreation and Conservation Office (RCO)
 Red Raspberry Commission (RASP)
 Redistricting Committee, State (RDC)
 Regulatory Assistance, Office of (ORA)
 Revenue, Department of (DOR)
 Salaries for Elected Officials, Citizens Commission on (WCCSEO)
 Salmon Recovery Funding Board (SRFB)
 Salmon Recovery Office, Governor's (GSRO)
 School Directors' Association, State (WSSDA)
 Secretary of State, Office of the (SECSTATE)
 Seed Potato Commission (SEED)
 Senate, Washington State (SENATE)
 Sentencing Guidelines Commission (SGC)
 Shorelines Hearings Board (SHB)
 Spokane Intercollegiate Research & Technology Institute (SIRTI)
 State Convention & Trade Center (CTC)
 State Fire Marshal, Office of the (FIRE)
 State Patrol, Washington (WSP)
 Substance Abuse, Governor's Council on (CSA)
 Supreme Court (SC)
 Tax Appeals, Board of (BTA)
 Tax Preferences, Citizen Commission for Performance Measurement of (PMTP)
Tobacco Settlement Authority (TOB)
 Traffic Records Committee (TRC)
 Traffic Safety Commission (WTSC)
 Transportation Commission, State (STC)
 Transportation Improvement Board (TIB)
 Treasurer, Office of the State (OST)
 Tree Fruit Research Commission (TREE)
 TVW, Public Affairs Network (TVW)
 Utilities and Transportation Commission (UTC)
 Veterans Affairs, Department of (DVA)
 Volunteer Firefighters & Reserve Officers, Board for (BVFF)
 Washington Wellness (WW)
 Wine Commission (WINE)
 Workforce Training and Education Coordinating Board (WFTECB)

References

 State Agencies, Boards and Commissions

Government of Washington (state)

Agencies, departments, and commissions
Washington